Jarque may refer to:

Places

 Jarque, a municipality in Zaragoza, Spain
 Jarque de la Val, a municipality in Teruel, Spain
 Hinojosa de Jarque, a municipality in Teruel, Spain
 Mezquita de Jarque, a municipality in Teruel, Spain

People

 Carlos Jarque, Mexican economist
 Daniel Jarque (1983–2009), Spanish footballer

Others

 The Jarque–Bera test, named after statisticians Carlos M. Jarque and Anil K. Bera